The Influence is a four-part online film starring Lee Byung-hun and Han Chae-young. The movie, which delves into the realms of mystery and fantasy, takes place over the time period 1907–2010.

Plot
A beautiful woman J, who has been trapped inside a massive water tank to be with W, invites TV anchorman Kim Woo-kyung and auctioneer Choi Dong-hoon to make a choice. One day, W is chased by a mysterious man and the hidden secret behind why W and J look at each other through a glass boundary of 100 years in time is slowly revealed.

Cast
Lee Byung-hun as W/White W
Han Chae-young as J
Cho Jae-hyun as Gojong
Jeon No-min as Kim Woo-kyung, TV anchorman
Lee Je-hoon as Sunjong
 Park Byung-eun as odd-eye
Kim Tae-woo as Choi Dong-hoon, Korean branch manager of auction company

References

External links
http://www.the-djc.com/

South Korean fantasy films
South Korean mystery films
2010 films
Films directed by Lee Jae-kyoo
2010s South Korean films